Hind bint ʿUtba, was an Arab woman who lived in the late 6th and early 7th centuries CE; she was the wife of Abu Sufyan ibn Harb, a powerful man of Mecca, in western Arabia. She was the mother of Mu'awiya I, the founder of the Umayyad dynasty, and of Hanzala, Juwayriya and Umm Hakam. Ramla bint Abi Sufyan, who became one of Muhammad's wives, was her stepdaughter.

Both Abu Sufyan and Hind originally opposed the Islamic prophet Muhammad before their conversion to Islam in 630. She is especially praised in Islamic sources for her military role at the Battle of Yarmouk.

Life 
She was born in Mecca, daughter of one of the most prominent leaders of the Quraysh, Utba ibn Rabi'a, and of Safiya bint Umayya ibn Abd Shams. Hence Safiyya and Utba are cousins. She had two brothers: Abu Hudhayfa ibn Utba and Walid ibn Utba. She also had two sisters: Atika bint Utba and Umm Kulthum bint Utba. Her father and her paternal uncle Shaibah ibn Rabī‘a were among the chief adversaries of Islam who eventually were killed by Ali in the Battle of Badr.

Her first husband was Hafs ibn Al-Mughira from the Makhzum clan, to whom she bore one son, Aban. Hafs died young after an illness. Hind then married his brother al-Fakah, who was much older than she was, but she accepted him because she wanted her son to grow up within his father's family. Al-Fakah owned a banqueting hall that the public were allowed to enter freely. One day he left Hind alone in the hall and returned home to see one of his employees leaving in a hurry. Assuming that his wife had a lover, he kicked her and asked her who the man had been. She replied that she had been asleep and did not know that anyone had entered; but al-Fakah did not believe her and he divorced her immediately.

Hind then found herself the subject of gossip. Her father Utba asked her to tell the truth about her divorce. "If the accusations are true, I will arrange to have al-Fakah murdered; and if they are false, I will summon him to appear before a soothsayer from Yemen." Hind swore by the gods that she was innocent, so Utba called the soothsayer. Hind was sitting among a crowd of women; the soothsayer walked up, struck her on the shoulder and said, "Arise, you chaste woman and no adulteress. You will give birth to a King!" Al-Fakah then took her hand, ready to accept her back as his wife; but Hind withdrew her hand and said, "Go away, for I shall make sure to bear him to some other man."

Hind refused another suitor in order to marry Abu Sufyan, who was her maternal first cousin and paternal second cousin, c.599. Her family borrowed the jewellery of the Abu'l-Huqayq clan in Medina so that she could adorn herself for the wedding.

Conflict with Muhammad

From 613 to 622, Muhammad preached the message of Islam publicly in Mecca. As he gathered converts, he and his followers faced increasing opposition. In 622 they emigrated to the distant city of Yathrib, now known as Medina. In 624, Muhammad organized an attack on the caravan led by Hind and her husband, Abu Sufyan, that was traveling to Syria for trade purposes. Once they got word of the incoming attack, Abu Sufyan put word out to organize a Meccan army to defend the caravan. This led to the Battle of Badr. The Muslims defeated the Meccans and Hind's father, son, brother and uncle were all killed in that battle.

Hind accompanied the Meccan forces to the Battle of Uhud. She was among the women who sang and danced, urging on their warriors.

On, ye sons of Abdaldar,
On, protectors of our rear,
Smite with every sharpened spear!
If you advance we hug you,
spread soft rugs beneath you;
if you retreat we leave you,
leave and no more love you.

During this battle, Jubayr ibn Mut'im bribed his slave Wahshi ibn Harb with manumission to kill Muhammad's uncle Hamza. Whenever Hind passed Wahshi, she called, "Come on, black man! Satisfy your vengeance and ours!" because Hamza was the one who had killed her uncle. Wahshi speared Hamza in the height of the battle; after Hamza was killed, Wahshi returned to retrieve his spear and then left the battle. After the battle, Hind and the women went to mutilate the corpses of the dead Muslims. They cut off noses and ears and made them into necklaces and anklets (Hind gave hers to Wahshi). She gouged out Hamza's liver and bit into it; but she was unable to swallow the bite and spat it out. (Ibn ‘Abdu l-Barr states in his book "al-Istī‘āb" that she cooked Hamza's heart before eating it.) Then she climbed a rock and "shrieked at the top of her voice":

We have paid you back for Badr
and a war that follows a war is always violent.
I could not bear the loss of Utba
nor my brother and his uncle and my first-born.
I have slaked my vengeance and fulfilled my vow.
You, O Wahshi, have assuaged the burning in my breast.
I shall thank Wahshi as long as I live
until my bones rot in the grave.

After the Conquest of Mecca in 630, however, Hind accepted Islam.

The Battle of Yarmouk
In the Battle of Yarmouk the Muslims were outnumbered by the Byzantines, but with the help of the women and boys amongst them, defeated the Eastern Roman Empire. The battle is also considered to be one of Khalid ibn al-Walid's greatest military victories. It cemented his reputation as one of the greatest tacticians and cavalry commanders in history.

Two of the earliest history books on Islam pay great tribute to Hind for her action in the midst of the battle. They show how the early Muslim women, including Hind bint Utba and Asma bint Abi Bakr, were instrumental in the Battle of Yarmouk. The Muslims were hugely outnumbered. Every time some men ran away, the women turned them back and fought, fearing that if they lost, the Romans would enslave them. Every time the men fled, the women would sing:

O you who flees from his loyal lady!
She is beautiful and stands firmly.
You're abandoning them to the Romans
to let them the forelocks and girls seize.
They will take what they want from us to the full
and start fighting themselves.

Hind sang the same song she had sung when she fought against the Muslims in the battle of Uhud:

Night star's daughters are we,
who walk on carpets soft they be
Our walk does friendliness tell
Our hands are perfumed musk smell
Pearls are strung around these necks of us
So come and embrace us
Whoever refuses will be separated forever
To defend his woman is there no noble lover?

After seeing the women fight, the men would return and say to each other: "If we do not fight, then we are more entitled to sit in the women's quarter than the women."

At one point, when arrows started raining down on Abu Sufyan and he tried to turn his horse away, Hind struck his horse in the face with a tent-peg and said: "Where do you think you're going, O Sakhr? Go back to battle and put effort into it until you compensate for having incited people in the past against Muhammad." An arrow later hit Abu Sufyan in the eye and he became blind.

References

Notes
 Guillaume, A. -- The Life of Muhammad, Oxford University Press, 1955
 Madelung, Wilferd -- The Succession to Muhammad, Cambridge University Press, 1997
 Watt, W. Montgomery -- Muhammad at Medina, Oxford University Press, 1956

External links
 Answering Ansar - a Shi'a site 

6th-century births
7th-century deaths
Women companions of the Prophet
Women in medieval warfare
Women in war in the Middle East
Banu Abd Shams
Arab women in war
Priestesses